Wickford railway station is on the Shenfield to Southend Line and is also the western terminus of the Crouch Valley Line in the east of England, serving the town of Wickford in the Basildon district of Essex. The Engineer's Line Reference for the line is SSV, the station's three-letter station code is WIC.

Peak-time Southminster trains also run through to London. Wickford station and all trains serving it are currently operated by Greater Anglia.

Description 

The line from Shenfield to Wickford and the station were opened for goods on 19 November 1888 and for passengers on 1 January 1889 by the Great Eastern Railway. Wickford station comprises two main line platforms (platform 2 for eastbound services and 3 for westbound services towards London), both with an operational length of 12 carriages, and two eastern-facing  branch line bay platforms (number 1 is used for trains from Southminster and number 4, which is very rarely used) at the eastern end of the station, each with an operational length of 5 carriages. At the London end of the station there once was a goods yard and turntable for steam locomotives, closed in 1954; a couple of sidings remain here for storing engineering vehicles or failed trains, but much of the railway land here is now in use as a car park for passengers. The line from Wickford to Southend Victoria was converted from semaphore signalling to 3-aspect, automatic and semi-automatic, colour light signals on 26 June 1938. At the same time the signal boxes at Fanton, Rayleigh, Hockley and Rochford were decommissioned. The Shenfield to Southend Victoria line was electrified using 1.5 kV DC overhead line electrification (OLE) on 31 December 1956. This was changed to 6.25 kV AC in November 1960 and to 25 kV AC on 25 January 1979. Platforms 1 and 4 were electrified when the Southminster branch was electrified on 12 May 1986.

The signal box that was formerly located at the end of platforms 3 and 4, before the bridge crossing Wickford High Street, was demolished in the early 1990s following the introduction of new signalling controlled from Liverpool Street. The upper floor of the original Great Eastern Railway station buildings on platforms 1 and 2 were destroyed by fire in the late 1990s, however, the ground floor (including the ticket office, waiting room and staff accommodation) was saved and remained in use until 2021.

In 2020, Greater Anglia submitted plans to demolish the station building so platform 1 can be extended for the new longer trains. It was demolished in 2021. The extended platform was opened on 26 June 2021.

Accidents and incidents
The incident caused damage to the infrastructure and carriages, and minor injury to two passengers on board the train.
On 31 January 1971, a collision occurred between a newspaper delivery train and the 04:04 passenger service from Southend Victoria, bound for Liverpool Street. Nobody was injured, however two carriages of the passenger train were extensively damaged and some minor damage was caused to the newspaper train. The newspaper train's driver had left his cab to check signals without having applied the brakes, leading to the train slipping back down the gradient of the Southminster branch line, into the Southend train which was stopped on the main line at Wickford.

Services 
All services at Wickford are operated by Greater Anglia. The typical off-peak service in trains per hour is:
 3 tph to London Liverpool Street
 3 tph to 
 1 train every 40 minutes to 

Additional services operate during the peak hours.

On Sundays, services between London and Southend are reduced to 2 tph and services to Southminster reduced to hourly.

References 

Branch Line to Southminster by Denis L Swindale .

External links 

History of the Crouch Valley Line
Local information about Crouch Valley Line

Transport in the Borough of Basildon
Railway stations in Essex
DfT Category C2 stations
Former Great Eastern Railway stations
Greater Anglia franchise railway stations
William Neville Ashbee railway stations
Railway stations in Great Britain opened in 1889
Wickford